Elliotdale is a town in Amatole District Municipality in the Eastern Cape province of South Africa.

The town lies 50 km south of Mthatha and 22 km south-east of Mqanduli. It is named after Sir Henry Elliot, Chief Magistrate of the Transkei from 1891 to 1902.

References

Populated places in the Mbhashe Local Municipality